The Dave Steele Carb Night Classic is a United States Auto Club dirt track car race held near Indianapolis, Indiana, United States, which takes place in late May before the Indianapolis 500 at the nearby Indianapolis Motor Speedway. Over its history, the event has been held at several different short tracks in Indiana, but since 1980, it has permanently been hosted at Lucas Oil Indianapolis Raceway Park in Brownsburg, Indiana. The event has long been considered one of the Indianapolis 500 traditions, along with the Hoosier Hundred and Little 500, which are also held over the same weekend at different venues in Indiana. Over the course of its history, numerous Indy 500 drivers have competed in the Night Before the 500, some winning.

For nearly 70 years, the event was better known as the Night Before the 500 and was traditionally scheduled the night immediately before the Indianapolis 500 and held under-the-lights. From its inception in 1946 through 2014, the event was held as a midget car race. In 2015, the race was switched to the USAC Silver Crown Series and held in the afternoon. In 2016, it was renamed Carb Night Classic and moved to Friday night of the Memorial Day weekend, to avoid conflicting with the Little 500 at Anderson Speedway. In 2018, the race was named after Dave Steele, a former USAC driver killed in a 2017 racing crash.

Various support races have accompanied the Midget main event including stock cars, Formula Super Vee, Formula Ford, and the Mini Indy series. Since 2010 (except in 2017), the Mazda Road to Indy U.S. F2000 and Pro Mazda racing series supported the event. The current name of the event is derived from "Carb Day", the final practice session for the Indianapolis 500, held at the Indianapolis Motor Speedway earlier in the afternoon. While the two events are not directly linked, they share a long and rich history of co-existence.

History

16th Street Speedway
The first Night Before the 500 event was held in 1946 at 16th Street Speedway (formerly Indianapolis Midget Speedway, and sometimes known as West 16th Street Speedway), a short track that was once located across the street from the Indianapolis Motor Speedway. The headline event was a double feature of Midget car racing sanctioned by the AAA Contest Board, held the night before the 1946 Indianapolis 500. The features were won by Benny Emerick and Leroy Warriner. The event quickly grew in popularity and prestige, and drew large fields of cars and large crowds.

After doubleheader features in 1946–1947, the event expanded to a tripleheader of features beginning in 1948. The three races were considered entirely separate events, each with their own practice and time trials, and occasionally a consolation race. The first race typically began around 2 p.m., the second race began around 7 p.m., and the third race (sometimes nicknames the "owl" race), began as late as 10 p.m. or even midnight. The racing typically continued well into the overnight hours, ending sometimes after 2 a.m. After the first feature, the grandstands were emptied, and the fans were required to exit the gates. After a brief wait, fans could buy tickets for the second feature, and re-enter. The process repeated after the second feature. Many spectators in attendance watched the races then walked across the street to get in line to wait for the gates to open at the Indianapolis Motor Speedway for the Indianapolis 500 the following morning.

In the first few years, the event had no official name. In 1954, the first appearance of the traditional moniker appeared, as the race was officially advertised as the "Now Famous - Night Before the 500".

The 1951 races were cancelled, then in 1952-1953 the program was changed to a single 100-lap feature. The tripleheader format returned in 1954. After 1955, AAA withdrew from automobile racing.

1956–1978

USAC took over sanctioning of the event beginning in 1956. The popular tripleheader format at 16th Street Speedway was maintained, and used through 1958. However, after the 1958 season, 16th Street Speedway was closed and later demolished. Over the next two decades, the event bounced around between several short tracks in Indiana. Kokomo Speedway, about an hour north of Indianapolis, held the event from 1959 to 1961, then it moved to the Indianapolis Speedrome for 1962–1964. It returned to Kokomo for 1965 to 1968, then moved to Indianapolis Raceway Park beginning in 1969.

In 1956, Shorty Templeman became the first and only driver to sweep all three features of the tripleheader in a single night. Templeman had failed to qualify for the Indianapolis 500 that year, and pocketed about $1,500 in prize money for the three-race sweep.

By 1959, the doubleheader and tripleheader formats had been mostly abandoned in favor of one longer feature. In addition, support races were filling the docket to improve the show for fans. The event moved to the Indiana State Fairgrounds oval in 1972-1973 and was held as two 50-lap features. But the 1973 Night Before the 500 was plagued by rain, much like the 1973 Indianapolis 500. The Night Before the 500 twin 50-lap Midget races were rained out on Sunday May 27 and initially rescheduled for June 17. However, a scheduling conflict saw the event rescheduled a second time until July 4 and the race was renamed the "Firecracker Fifties." On July 4, the event was cancelled due to heavy rain, and never rescheduled. After that much-maligned event, the Night Before the 500 returned to IRP the following season.

Beginning in 1974, the Indianapolis 500 was permanently moved to Sunday, which meant the Night Before the 500 races were likewise permanently moved to Saturday night each year.

During the period when the "Night Before the 500" was held at Kokomo, the Speedrome, or the Fairgrounds, IRP sometimes also held their own docket of races the same night (and vice versa). But these races were not considered part of the continuous lineage of the traditional "Night Before the 500" classic. When the races were at Kokomo, organizers regularly set up bus service from the Indianapolis Motor Speedway to Kokomo (which was about an hour to the north) in an effort to boost attendance.

1979
For 1979, a one-time doubleheader of two separate Midget racing events were scheduled for the same day (Saturday May 26). The first event was held at Indianapolis Raceway Park, a doubleheader of the USAC Midgets and the Formula Super Vee-based Mini Indy Series. The management at IRP decided to move their event to the daytime due to the rising cost of lighting the track. The event was billed as the Volkswagen's Day Before the 500, as the Formula Super Vee cars used Volkswagen engines. Later in the evening, a second USAC Midget event was scheduled across town at the Indianapolis Speedrome, and was held under the traditional name Coca-Cola Night Before the 500. Many USAC Midget drivers were entered for both events. Arrangements were made for the drivers to be transported from one venue to the other by police escort. The first midget event was held as scheduled at IRP, but the Super Vee event was rained out and rescheduled for Sunday evening (May 27) after the conclusion of the Indy 500. Likewise, the "Night Before the 500" midget race at the Speedrome were also rained out, and postponed until Sunday night May 27.

1980–2014
In 1980, IRP completed an improvement project which included new lights, and the Night Before the 500 classic was moved back to the facility permanently. In addition to the traditional Midget feature, various support races began being scheduled as part of the evening. Formula Super Vee ran at the oval for five races. Mark Smith won the race in 1989. His fastest lap of 0:19.581 is still the current track record. In 1983, Jeff Andretti won a Formula Ford race. From 2010 to 2016, the Road to Indy U.S. F2000 National Championship and Pro Mazda Championship supported the event.

During the 1980s and 1990s, several future stars of NASCAR and IndyCar headlined the event. Drivers such as Ken Schrader, Jeff Gordon, Ryan Newman, Kasey Kahne, Jason Leffler were among those with wins in the midget feature.

2015
Following USAC ceasing sanctioning of paved midget cars, for 2015 the event switched to the USAC Silver Crown Series. In addition, the event was moved up to Saturday afternoon in an effort to boost attendance and give fans a better opportunity to take in the event, without conflicting with the many other events of the busy racing weekend. The name of the event was changed to the Day Before the 500 and was part of four days of USAC events in the area including also the Hulman Classic, the Hoosier Hundred, and the Little 500.

2016–present
The move to daytime was short-lived, and for 2016, the event was revamped once again. For many years the Night Before the 500 classic was held on the same night and at the same time as the Little 500, splitting fans (and some competitors) between both events. It was decided to move the event permanently to Friday night of Memorial Day weekend. Once again, it would be held under-the-lights, and it was renamed the Carb Night Classic...The Race Before the 500. The name derived from Carb Day at the Indianapolis Motor Speedway, the traditional final day of practice for the Indianapolis 500, which was earlier in the afternoon. The move made for four USAC events over four consecutive nights, leading up to the Indianapolis 500 on Sunday. The Hulman Classic would be scheduled for Wednesday night, the Hoosier Hundred Thursday night, the Carb Night Classic Friday night, and the Little 500 on Saturday night.

After former winner Dave Steele's death, the track began starting in 2018, to name the event in his memory. Due to the COVID-19 pandemic, the 2020 Indianapolis 500 was postponed to August 23, therefore the Carb Night Classic was held on August 21, whereas a revival of the Night Before the 500 race was held on August 22. The sprint and midget races are non-championship, because USAC does not sanction midget or sprint car championship races on pavement. The USAC midgets continued having a non-points race the following editions of the event.

Race winners

AAA Midgets
From its inception in 1946 through 1955, the Night Before the 500 was part of the AAA Midgets championship.

USAC Midgets
After AAA withdrew from racing, the Night Before the 500 feature event became part of the USAC Midgets national championship series.

USAC Silver Crown Series (Carb Night Classic)
Beginning in 2015, the headlining event switched to the USAC Silver Crown. The race moved to Friday nights starting in 2016.

Notes
1973: The twin 50-lap Midget races were rained out on Sunday May 27 and initially rescheduled for June 17. However, a scheduling conflict saw the event rescheduled a second time until July 4 and the race was renamed the "Firecracker Fifties." On July 4, the event was cancelled due to heavy rain, and never rescheduled.
1979: For 1979, a doubleheader of two separate Midget racing events were scheduled for the same day (Saturday May 26). The first event was held at Indianapolis Raceway Park, a doubleheader of the USAC Midgets and the Mini Indy Series. The event was billed as the "Day Before the 500". Later in the evening, a second USAC Midget event was scheduled across town at the Indianapolis Speedrome, and was held under the traditional name "Night Before the 500." Most USAC Midget drivers were entered for both events. The first midget event was held as scheduled at IRP, but the Formula Super Vee event was rained out and rescheduled for Sunday evening May 27 after the Indianapolis 500.
1982: Race rained out on Saturday May 29 and rescheduled for July 3.
1995: Race rained out on Saturday May 27 and rescheduled for Sunday May 28.
1998: Race rained out on Saturday May 23 and rescheduled for Sunday May 24.
2001: Race rained out on Saturday May 26 and rescheduled for Sunday May 27.
2020: Race delayed and rescheduled for August 21 due to COVID-19 pandemic
2021: Race rained out on Friday May 28 and rescheduled for Saturday May 29.

Support races

References

Indianapolis 500
Motorsport in Indiana
Recurring sporting events established in 1946
1946 establishments in Indiana
Annual sporting events in the United States